Castle Combe Circuit is a motor racing circuit in Wiltshire, England, approximately  from Bristol. The circuit is based on the perimeter track of a former World War II airfield, and was opened for racing in 1950.

History 
The Castle Combe airfield opened in May 1941 on land of the Castle Combe estate, owned by the Gorst family, and operated as RAF Castle Combe for seven years before being decommissioned in 1948. During the war, the airfield was a training ground for pilots. From 1946 to 1948 the buildings served as a resettlement camp for Polish ex-service personnel. The property was returned to the Gorst family in 1948; with the Bristol Motorcycle & Light Car Club, they organized the first race in July 1950. By 1955 the property was divided and sold. Between 1956 and 1961, the circuit was used for motorcycle racing. Some years later, the circuit was converted to motor racing.

Castle Combe has staged many different motorsport disciplines over the years. In 1997, Nigel Greensall established a lap record. However, this was the last year that the circuit would remain unaltered. An accident involving the death of a spectator forced the owners into installing two new chicanes in order to slow the cars down.

Formula Three returned to Castle Combe in 2001. However, in 2005, the circuit was issued with a noise nuisance order. The British Formula Three Championship and the British GT Championship were both louder than permitted, and so were prevented from returning.

Present 
Races include a home-circuit championship with classes for Saloon cars, Sports and GTs, and Formula Ford. Racing clubs from around the UK include the track in the events for their championships, including the 750 Motor Club, and BRSCC. Once a year motorcycle racing takes place over two days during the summer. The weekend includes a sidecar championship and an historic race, as well as the more modern supersport races.

As well as holding trackdays for both cars and motorcycles, Castle Combe Circuit holds a large number of car shows. These shows follow a general motorsport theme and exhibit show stands, market stalls, stunt demonstrations, classic displays and on certain days the circuit is able to hold track sessions. Since 2001 Rallyday, an annual demonstration event for rally cars, has also been held. Motoring shows Top Gear and Fifth Gear have used this circuit to race or test cars on.

The circuit hosts a Greenpower event, one round in a series held at various racetrack-type venues. When not in use for racing, the circuit is the venue for a regular car boot sale that has become one of the biggest in the South West. In May it also hosts an annual steam rally.

Lap Records 

The fastest official race lap records at Castle Combe Circuit are listed as:

Notes

References

External links 

 Castle Combe Circuit
 Greenpower Education Trust

Motorsport venues in England
Sports venues in Wiltshire
Circuit, Castle Combe